Ali Al-Zein (Arabic:  علي الزين , born 1949) is a Lebanese actor and voice actor. He is a cousin of Ahmad Al-Zein.

Filmography

Film 
Beirut Open City. 2008

Television 
khamsa wnos. 2019
thawani. 2019
wein kenty 2. 2017
wein kenty 1. 2016
Ain El Jawza. 2015
Bab Almorad. 2014
The Third Man. 1985
From Day to Day. 1983
Shahrzad's Nights. 1980
Izz ad-Din al-Qassam
Miscreants' Time - Abu Ali

Dubbing roles 
 Mokhtarnameh - Ibn Huraith
 Prophet Joseph - Ninifer Kibta
 Saint Mary

References

External links 

Lebanese male actors
Lebanese male television actors
Lebanese male voice actors
Living people
1949 births
20th-century Lebanese male actors
21st-century Lebanese male actors